Tourism in Gilgit-Baltistan, a administered territory of Pakistan, focuses on the mountains.

Geography

Gilgit-Baltistan borders Pakistan's Khyber Pakhtunkhwa Province to the west, a small portion of the Wakhan Corridor of Afghanistan to the north, Xinjiang, China to the northeast, the Indian territory Jammu and Kashmir and Ladakh to the southeast, and the Pakistani-administered state of Azad Kashmir to the south.

Gilgit-Baltistan is home to five of the "eight-thousanders" and to more than fifty peaks above . GilgitAstore  and Skardu are the three main hubs for expeditions to those mountains. The region is home to some of the world's highest mountain ranges. The main ranges are the Karakoram and the western Himalayas. The Pamir Mountains are to the north, and the Hindu Kush lies to the west. Amongst the highest mountains are K2 (Mount Godwin-Austen) and Nanga Parbat, the latter being one of the most feared mountains in the world.

Three of the world's longest glaciers outside the polar regions are found in Gilgit-Baltistan: the Biafo Glacier, the Baltoro Glacier, and the Batura Glacier. There are, in addition, several high-altitude lakes in Gilgit-Baltistan.

Karakoram Highway 
The Karakoram Highway is the major highway of Gilgit-Baltistan, which connects the region with the rest of Pakistan to the south and with China at its north end. It is highest paved road in world is sometimes termed as the "8th Wonder of World."

Major valleys 
Gilgit Baltistan is home of world highest and beautiful valleys. These include Ghanche, Shiger, Astore Valley, Gilgit, Ghizer Valley, Hunza Valley, Skardu and Nagar Valley.

Hunza Valley 
Hunza Valley is considered one of the most beautiful valleys of Gilgit-Baltistan. It consists of Upper Hunza, Central Hunza, and Lower Hunza. Karimabad is the major city of the valley and has all facilities for mountaineers and tourists. The popularity of the Hunza Valley and the amount of tourism there is due in part to its relative accessibility and proximity to the Karakoram Highway.

Major tourist attractions in Hunza are:

 Attabad Lake - A major lake of Hunza Valley. It was created following a landslide at Hunza River near Attabad village on 4 January 2010. The resulting damming of the river caused the lake to slowly form, submerging several villages and displacing up to 6,000 people.
 Baltit Fort - An old medieval fort located in Karimabad. It is also a UNESCO World Heritage Site.
 Hussaini Suspension Bridge - A long wooden suspension bridge over Hunza River near Husaaini village. It is sometimes referred locally to as the "Indiana Jones Bridge" It is termed as one of the most dangerous bridges in the world.
Khunjerab Pass - At 4,693 meters, this is the highest border crossing in the world. It is also the only modern crossing on the China-Pakistan border. Most tourists visit on a daytrip from Hunza to see the border and then leave. The surrounding area is also a part of the Khunjerab National Park, which was set up to protect local, endangered wildlife, specifically the Marco Polo sheep.

Skardu Valley
Skardu Valley is located at confluence of Indus and Shiger rivers surrounded by the peaks of Karakoram.

Lakes 
 Sheosar tso Lake in Deosai National Park, Skardu
 Satpara tso Lake in Skardu, Baltistan
 Katzura tso Lake in Skardu, Baltistan
 Katpana tso Lake in Skardu, Baltistan
 Zharba Tso Lake in Shigar, Baltistan
 Phoroq Tso Lake in Skardu, Baltistan
 Lake Kharfak tso in Gangche, Baltistan
 Sozgung tso Lake in Thalay Valley, Baltistan
 Byarsa Tso Lake in Gultari, Baltistan
 Borith Lake in Gojal, upper Hunza, Gilgit
 Rama sar Lake near Astore
 Rush sar Lake near Nagar, Gilgit
 Karambar sar Lake at Kromber Pass Ishkoman Valley, Ghizer
 Barodaroksh Lake in Bar Valley, Nagar
 Ghorashi Lake in Ghandus Valley, Kharmang
 Attabad Lake, Hunza
 Khalti Lake, Gupis-Yasin District

Mountains

Eight-thousanders 
K2 (Mount Godwin Austin/Chogori)
Nanga Parbat
Gasherbrum l
Broad Peak
Gasherbrum ll

Seven-thousanders 
Gasherbrum lll
Gasherbrum lV
Masherbrum (K1)
Rakaposhi
Saltoro Kangri (K10)

See also 
 Tourism in Pakistan

References

External links 

Tourism in Gilgit-Baltistan, PTDC
Gilgit-Baltistan tourism website
Tourism Development in Gilgit-Baltistan - Situation Analysis and Investment Opportunities

 
Tourism in Pakistan